Jože Prelogar (born 5 March 1959) is a Slovenian football manager and former player. He played as a midfielder.

References

External links
Profile at SK Austria Kärnten 

1959 births
Living people
Footballers from Ljubljana
Slovenian footballers
Association football midfielders
NK Rudar Velenje players
NK Olimpija Ljubljana (1945–2005) players
NK Maribor players
NK Celje players
ND Gorica players
NK Ljubljana players
NK Krka players
NK Ivančna Gorica players
FC Kärnten players
Slovenian football managers
NK Olimpija Ljubljana (1945–2005) managers
SK Austria Klagenfurt managers
SK Austria Kärnten managers
Slovenian expatriate footballers
Slovenian expatriate sportspeople in Austria
Expatriate footballers in Austria
Slovenian expatriate football managers
Expatriate football managers in Austria